Theo Timmermans (4 January 1926 – 6 January 2004) was a Dutch footballer  active from the mid-late 1940's. He played for 2 clubs starting at ADO '20 before joining Nîmes in 1949 and then moving back to ADO '20 in 1954. Timmermans wore the number 10 while playing for Ado '20

He played in twelve matches for the Netherlands national team.

References

1926 births
Nîmes Olympique players
2004 deaths
Dutch footballers
Netherlands international footballers
Association football forwards